Prabhakar Balwant Vaidya was an Indian politician, belonging to the Communist Party of India. He became Secretary of the Bombay City Provincial Committee of CPI in 1955. He was a member of the Maharashtra Legislative Council in the 1960s, part of the Samyukta Maharashtra Samiti caucus.

References

Communist Party of India politicians from Maharashtra
Members of the Maharashtra Legislative Council